The Rufford bent-toed gecko (Cyrtodactylus rufford) is a species of gecko that is endemic to central Laos.

References 

Cyrtodactylus
Reptiles described in 2016